A writ which lies for the tenants of ancient demesne who hold by free charter, and not for those tenants who hold by copy of court roll, or by the rod, according to the custom of the manor.

References

Writs
Writs of prevention
Legal documents with Latin names